Dezhnev may refer to:
Cape Dezhnev
Semyon Dezhnyov
 3662 Dezhnev
 Icebreaker Semyon Dezhnev